Kóka is a village in Pest county, Hungary. Olympian János Dosztály was born here.

References

Populated places in Pest County